Donny Pritzlaff (born January 23, 1979) is a freestyle wrestler who represented the United States in international competition, winning bronze medals at the 2006 World Wrestling Championships and at the 2007 FILA Wrestling World Cup. He resides in New Jersey and is an assistant coach for the Rutgers Scarlet Knights wrestling team.

Junior career 
Born in Red Bank, New Jersey, Pritzlaff grew up in Lyndhurst, New Jersey and graduated from Lyndhurst High School in 1997, where he was a three-time NJSIAA individual state champion and finished his high school wrestling career with a record of 127–4.

College career 
Pritzlaff was a two-time NCAA champion, three-time Big Ten Conference champions, and four-time All-American at the University of Wisconsin.  Pritzlaff graduated from Wisconsin in 2002 with a degree in sociology.  Pritzlaff was also the 1998 junior world champion.

International career 
At the 2006 World Wrestling Championships, Pritzlaff won a bronze medal.  Pritzlaff also won a bronze medal at the 2007 FILA Wrestling World Cup.

Coaching career 
Pritzlaff held the following positions:

Volunteer assistant coach, University of Wisconsin, 2002-2003
Assistant coach, Hofstra University, 2004-2006
Assistant coach, University of Wisconsin, 2007-2009
Associate head coach, University of Wisconsin, 2009-2011
Assistant coach, University of Michigan, 2011-2014
Associate head coach, Rutgers University, 2014–Present

References 

1979 births
Living people
American male sport wrestlers
Lyndhurst High School alumni
People from Lyndhurst, New Jersey
People from Red Bank, New Jersey
Sportspeople from Bergen County, New Jersey
Rutgers Scarlet Knights wrestling coaches
Wisconsin Badgers wrestlers
Hofstra Pride wrestling coaches
Wisconsin Badgers wrestling coaches
Michigan Wolverines wrestling coaches